Dennis Dickson Cunningham (January 2, 1936 – March 5, 2022) was an American civil rights lawyer. He was a founder of the People’s Law Office. After the killings of Fred Hampton and Mark Clark, he successfully sued the United States government on behalf of the Black Panthers. In 1982, the case was settled for $1.85 million.

References

1936 births
2022 deaths
20th-century American lawyers
American civil rights lawyers

Black Panther Party